Okinawa Development Finance Corporation (ODFC), Okinawa Shinkō Kaihatsu Kin'yū Kōko (沖縄振興開発金融公庫), is a Policy-based financial services  institution. ODFC's headquarters are located in Tokyo, Japan.

Overview 
The ODFC's key role is to promote the development of industries in Okinawa. This is through the provision of long-term loans and other financial facilities to small and medium-sized entrepreneurs in the island that are in the agriculture, housing, forestry, fishery and medical industries. The ODFC will also finance citizens who have met difficulties obtaining funding from private financial institutions. Through such financial assistance, the ODFC aims to vitalize the local economy of Okinawa and aid in the development of the local society.

History 
The Okinawa Development Finance Corporation was established on May 15, 1972 with the passing of the Okinawa Development Finance Corporation Law. This law was established along with Okinawa's return to Japan from American military occupation in order to carry out a unified and comprehensive policy-oriented financing in Okinawa. The ODFC's objective was also to fill the socio-economic gaps that existed between Okinawa and mainland Japan.

The Law led to the consolidation of the following special public corporations into the then newly formed ODFC:
 Masses Finance Corporation (大衆金融公庫) - Founded in 1964 by the Ryukyu government to finance livelihood funds that target residents
 Ryukyu Development Finance Corporation (琉球開発金融公社) - Founded in 1959 by the United States Civil Administration of the Ryukyu Islands to provide long term capital funds in Okinawa.
 Various Ryukyu government special development accounts including:
 Industrial development funds flexibility special account
 Agriculture, Forestry and Fisheries funds flexibility special account
 Housing construction funds flexibility special account
 Carrier construction funds flexibility special account
, the ODFC has lent out ¥ 946.3 billion and ¥ 4.2 billion in loans and investments respectively, 211 employees and 6 Offices.

Ownership 
ODFC is wholly owned by the Government of Japan through the Ministry of Finance.

Governance 
The Okinawa Development Finance Corporation is governed by six person board of directors. The board consists of Chairman, a Vice Chairman, three directors and an auditor. The Chairman and auditor are appointed by the Minister of Finance while the Vice Chairman and directors are appointed by the chairman but approved by the minister.

See also 
 List of banks in Japan
 Bank of Japan
 Development Bank of Japan
 Japan Finance Corporation

References

External links 
 Okinawa Development Finance Corporation
 Company Overview of The Okinawa Development Finance Corporation

Banks of Japan
Government-owned companies of Japan
1972 establishments in Japan
Banks established in 1972